Ian Ray Buxton (17 April 1938 – 1 October 2010) was an English footballer and cricketer. He played football as an inside forward for Derby County between 1959 and 1967, before brief spells with Luton Town, Notts County, Port Vale, and non-league Ilkeston Town. He played a total of 215 league games in the English Football League, helping Luton Town to the Fourth Division title in 1967–68, also helping Port Vale to win promotion out of the Fourth Division in 1969–70. He also played cricket for Derbyshire from 1959 to 1973, serving the county as captain between 1970 and 1972.

Football career

Derby County
Buxton started his career at Derby County, helping them to an 18th-place finish in the Second Division in 1959–60. Making his debut under Harry Storer, he scored twice in a 3–1 home win over Ipswich Town. He proved to be "adept at holding the ball and bringing others into play." The "Rams" then rose to 12th in 1960–61, before dropping to 16th in 1961–62. Derby finished 18th again 1962–63 under new boss Tim Ward, just five points ahead of relegated Walsall. They rallied to 13th in 1963–64, before posting ninth and eighth-place finishes in 1964–65 and 1965–66. Derby then dropped to 17th in 1966–67, just six points above relegated Northampton Town. However manager Brian Clough was not comfortable with a player splitting his loyalties between football and cricket, and so he moved Buxton on.

Luton Town
He signed with Allan Brown's Luton Town for an £11,000 fee in September 1967. He helped the Kenilworth Road side to the Fourth Division title in 1967–68, scoring 13 goals from 36 starts. Alec Stock then led the club to a third-place finish in the Third Division in 1968–69, just three points behind promoted Swindon Town.

Later career
He signed with Notts County of the Fourth Division for the 1969–70 campaign, but played just five games at Meadow Lane. He joined Port Vale in December 1969 in what was initially a three-month arrangement. He scored on his debut at inside-left, a 1–0 win over Oldham Athletic at Vale Park on 13 December, and was a regular throughout the rest of the club's 1969–70 promotion winning side. The club paid the £500 registration fee to sign him permanently, in the knowledge that his cricket commitments meant he would miss the last four games anyway. However, he retired from football at the end of that season, in order to focus on his cricket. He scored six goals in eighteen games for Gordon Lee's "Valiants". He soon came out of retirement though, joining Ilkeston Town in July 1970.

Cricket career

Buxton's career with Derbyshire started in the Second XI in the 1959 season, and, later on in the same season he played his debut match against Yorkshire, taking three wickets. He took his first five-wicket haul during the season, as Derbyshire finished in a promising seventh place in the championship.

Though his averages were somewhat down in the following season, it was his first of two ten-wicket hauls in 1961 which truly brought him to the attention of the selectors, as he finished with match figures of 10/104 against Warwickshire. Buxton was a first-choice player in the team over the next four seasons, during which time he posted one more ten-wicket match, against Worcestershire in June 1968.

Buxton was captain of Derbyshire between 1970 and 1972. He was a right-handed batsman and a right-arm medium-pace bowler. He was a consistent middle-order batsman whose skill with the ball helped him to gain a first-team place and, between 1970 and 1972, the Derbyshire club captaincy. He played exactly 350 first-class matches with the Derbyshire first team before retiring in 1973.

Later life and death
He made a cricket comeback some 20 years after retiring from playing, serving on the committee for several years during the 1990s. He was married to Doreen, and had two children as well as five grandchildren. He died, aged 72, at his Matlock home on 1 October 2010.

Career statistics
Source:

Honours
Luton Town
Football League Fourth Division: 1967–68

Port Vale
Football League Fourth Division fourth-place promotion: 1969–70

References

External links
 Ian Buxton at Cricket Archive

1938 births
2010 deaths
People from Cromford
Footballers from Derbyshire
Cricketers from Derbyshire
English footballers
Association football forwards
Derby County F.C. players
Luton Town F.C. players
Notts County F.C. players
Port Vale F.C. players
Ilkeston Town F.C. (1945) players
English Football League players
English cricketers
Derbyshire cricket captains
International Cavaliers cricketers